Voivodeni (also Sânioana or Sântioana;) is a commune in Mureș County, Transylvania, Romania. It is composed of two villages, Toldal (Toldalag) and Voivodeni. The former village is much less populated than the latter.

This a commune is within a region known as Transylvania and is the centrally located in Romania. It is also at an average altitude of 1230 feet, which is less than the average height where a landmass is considered a mountain (2,000 feet).

The average rainfall is about 31 inches a year, with about 5 inches in May and about 1.5 inches in February on average.

History 

The first mention of the town was in 1332, under the name of Sancto Johanne. Archaeological finds have shown that the  area comprising the Voivodendi village was first settled during the Bronze period. In the commune town of Toldal, there is definite finds of Roman settlers, who focused on agricultural production.

During the Kingdom of Hungary, the commune belonged to the Régen district. It had been was part of the Székely Land region of the historical Transylvania province. This was kept when the Kingdom was absorbed into the Austrian Empire and the Austro-Hungarian Empire. For instance, in 1876, there was an administrative reorganization of Transylvania, and it was attached to the county of Maros-Torda. This meant that until 1918, the village belonged to the Maros-Torda County.

After the Treaty of Trianon of 1920, it became part of Romania 
and later became part of the district of Mureș, then Mureș County. It was  occupied by Hungary 
from 1940 to 1944, during which the small  Jewish community in the area was exterminated by the Nazis. It became part of Romania again in 1945.

The commune features the Zichy Castle, with relics from the Roman area and Hungarian presence.
Famous people who have lived in the commune include politician István Dán and biologist (and geographer) Pál Samu, born on June 28, 1935.

Demographics 

The highest number of people living in the commune, since recording of population information began in 1850, was in 1956, with a total of 2,849 inhabitants. The highest number of Magyars was in 1941, while Romanians reached their highest number in the commune in 1966, Roma in 1939, and Romanian Germans  in 1941. To put it in perspective, in 1910 the commune had 1729 inhabitants but this had only risen to 1768 by 1992.

According to the last census, in 2011, the population of the Voivodeni commune was 1,756 inhabitants. This was a decrease from the last census, in 2002, when 1,957 were living in the commune. Of the inhabitants, about 60% were Hungarian, while the rest were either Romanian (28.4%) or Roma (9.05%), with about 2% having an unknown ethnicity. This means that the commune has a (Székely) Hungarian majority.

In terms of religious belief, most are Reformed (about 57%), while the rest are either Orthodox (about 28%), Seventh-Day Adventists (about 4%), Jehovah's Witnesses (3.4%), Roman Catholic (2.5%) or non-religious (1.6%). About 2% of the population had religious beliefs that cannot be determined.

Present day 

The commune of Voivodeni is administered by a mayor and a local council which is composed of 11 councilors. The Mayor is Vasile Boer, from the Social Democratic Party, who was elected in 2012. The local council has the following composition of political parties after local elections in 2016:

 Social Democratic Party (Romania) – 7 seats 
 Hungarian Democratic Union of Romania – 3 seats 
 Hungarian Civic Party – 1 seat

Dance classes are held in the commune, like other parts of Transylvania, and churches made of wood are still standing. The economy of the town is based on agriculture and livestock.
The municipality is also located on the regional road DJ154J Breaza -Glodeni, near the national road DN15 Târgu Mureș - Reghin.

Tourist attractions in the commune include the Reformed-Calvinist Church in the village of Voivodeni, built in the 15th century, and the Zichy Mansion in Vojvodina, constructed in the 18th century, to name two historical monuments. There are also several lakes, like Lacul Sate, where tourists can fish.

See also 
 List of Hungarian exonyms (Mureș County)

References

External links
 Official site of commune
  Wikimedia Atlas of Romania
 Wikimedia Atlas of Transylvania
 Voivodeni Castle
 Administrative map of the district
 Communes of Romania
 Romanian Law and Miscellaneous
 Map of Mureş County

Communes in Mureș County
Localities in Transylvania